Más Adelante (Ahead) is the title of a studio album released by the banda (music band) La Arrolladora Banda El Limón. This album became their first number-one set on the Billboard Top Latin Albums chart.

Track listing
The track listing from Allmusic.

Charts

Weekly charts

Year-end charts

Sales and certifications

References

2009 albums
La Arrolladora Banda El Limón albums
Spanish-language albums
Disa Records albums